Herbertus Bikker (born 15 July 1915 in Wijngaarden, Netherlands – died 1 November 2008 in Haspe, Germany), also known as The Butcher of Ommen, was a Dutch war criminal. He was a member of the Waffen-SS. In this function, Bikker served as a guard at the prison and work camp Erika near Ommen. He received his nickname due to his brutal behaviour at the prison camp.

Bikker is the alleged murderer of Dutch resistance fighter  who was killed, twenty-seven years old, on 17 November 1944.

Following the end of World War II, he was sentenced to death by a Dutch court. Together with Klaas Carel Faber,  and four other convicted war criminals, he managed to escape from prison in Breda on 26 December 1952 and fled to Germany, crossing the border at Ubbergen near Cleves. Settling in the city of Hagen, he lived in Germany undetected until 1995. Following a decree from 1943, foreign members of the Waffen-SS automatically received German nationality. Germany does not extradite its own nationals.

Finally, being one of the few surviving war criminals, he was taken to court after all in Germany. Bikker's only chance to evade prosecution and trial was to claim diminished responsibility due to illness. When a doctor attested Bikker's limited responsibility, his case came to court. However, following a breakdown and fainting in court, neurologists advised against Bikker standing trial due illness. Court was adjourned on 2 February 2004.

Bikker lived in Hagen as a pensioner until his death, which was not made public until April 2009.

External links 
 Former SS member faces trial for war crimes in the Netherlands, wsws.org, 21 January 2004
 Germany: Trial against former SS member Herbertus Bikker abandoned, wsws.org,  24 March 2004
 Nazi 'hangman' dies after life of liberty in Germany, The Daily Telegraph, 29 April 2009

20th-century Dutch criminals
1915 births
2008 deaths
Dutch escapees
Dutch collaborators with Nazi Germany
Dutch people convicted of murder
Dutch people convicted of war crimes
Dutch people of World War II
Escapees from Dutch detention
Nazi concentration camp personnel
People convicted of murder by the Netherlands
People from Graafstroom
People indicted for war crimes
Prisoners sentenced to death by the Netherlands
Dutch Waffen-SS personnel
Holocaust perpetrators in the Netherlands
Dutch emigrants to Germany